Jan Chozen Bays (born 1945), is a Zen teacher, author, mindful eating educator, and pediatrician specializing in work with abused children.

Biography
Jan Chozen Bays was born in Chicago, Illinois on August 9, 1945. She grew up in East Greenbush, New York and spent two years in Korea. She received her undergraduate degree at Swarthmore College and earned her medical degree at the University of California at San Diego, specializing in pediatrics.

It was after Bays began practicing Zen in a group that included Charlotte Joko Beck, Anne Seisen Saunders, and Jerry Shishin Wick in San Diego. She eventually moved to the Zen Center of Los Angeles to study with the Japanese Zen teacher Taizan Maezumi Roshi. She had an extramarital affair with him, which she admitted,  which devastated his wife and children.  She served as the physician at the Zen Center’s community medical clinic. She was a student of Maezumi from 1977 until his death in 1995. She received dharma transmission from him in 1983 becoming his 4th dharma heir and, after Joko Beck, the second woman.

With her husband Laren Hogen Bays, since 1985 she has been a teacher at the Zen Community of Oregon, a Zen center or sangha in Portland, Oregon.  Chozen and Hogen Bays are also co-founders and co-abbots of Great Vow Zen Monastery of Clatskanie, Oregon, which opened in 2002. From 1990 until the present she has trained with Shodo Harada, a Rinzai Zen teacher. In 2011, Bays founded Heart of Wisdom Zen Temple in Portland, Oregon.

Child abuse expert 
Bays is a pediatrician and nationally recognized expert on child abuse. In the 1980s and 1990s, she conducted the medical examinations of thousands of infants and children who had been abused or killed and regularly appeared in court as an expert witness. In 1987, she helped to found Child Abuse Response and Evaluation Services (CARES) Northwest, now one of the oldest and largest child abuse assessment centers in the United States.

Bibliography 
Bays, Jan Chozen (2003). Jizo Bodhisattva: Guardian of Children, Travelers, and Other Voyagers. Shambhala Publications. 

Bays, Jan Chozen (2014). Mindfulness on the Go: Simple Meditation Practices You Can Do Anywhere. Shambhala Publications. .
Bays, Jan Chozen (2016). The Vow-Powered Life: A Simple Method for Living with Purpose. Shambhala Publications. .
Bays MD, Jan Chozen (2022). Mindful Medicine: 40 Simple Practices to Help Healthcare Professionals Heal Burnout and Reconnect to Purpose. Shambhala Publications. ISBN 9781645470526.

Gallery

See also
Gyokuko Carlson
Timeline of Zen Buddhism in the United States

References

External links
Great Vow Zen Monastery
Zen Community of Oregon
Jizo Bodhisattva, Modern Healing and Traditional Buddhist Practice, 
Elijah Board of World Religious Leaders

Soto Zen Buddhists
Rinzai Buddhists
White Plum Asanga
Zen Buddhism writers
Zen Buddhist spiritual teachers
1945 births
Living people
American Zen Buddhists
Buddhist abbesses